Vavrišovo is a village and municipality in the Liptovský Mikuláš District in the Žilina Region of northern Slovakia.

History
The village was first mentioned in historical records in the year 1231.

During the late 17th century resistance developed among the nobility and serfs against the Habsburg government, especially after the Bratislava Diet in 1687, which passed measures that limited professional interests and privileges of the nobility. General hatred resulted in Rákóczi's War of Independence, an uprising led by Francis II Rákóczi.

In 1704, Rákoczi's rebel band (Kuruc) entered Slovakia. The village of Vavrišovo Kokava was burned during the ensuing war.  In 1708, the Kuruc army suffered defeat at the Battle of Trencin, and this was a turning point in the war. The locality was involved in the Liptov campaign of August 1709. One of the last battles of the rebellion took place around the village of Vavrišovo.

Richtari (Vogts) of Vavrisovo 1784-1931

Mayors of Vavrisovo 1944-

Geography

The municipality lies at an altitude of 668 meters and covers an area of 9.906 km². It has a population of about 598 people.

External links
http://www.vavrisovo.sk

Villages and municipalities in Liptovský Mikuláš District